East District may refer to:
 East Delhi, India
 East District, Chiayi, Taiwan
 East District, Hsinchu, Taiwan
 East District, Taichung, Taiwan
 East District, Tainan, Taiwan
 East District (Panzhihua), Sichuan, China
 East District (Zhongshan), Guangdong, China

See also
Eastern District (disambiguation)
 East Sikkim district